Coreoleuciscus aeruginos is a species of ray-finned fish in the genus Coreoleuciscus found in Nakdong and Seomjin rivers in South Korea.

References

Coreoleuciscus
Cyprinid fish of Asia
Fish described in 2015